Leo Giuseppe Insam (born 6 February 1975) is an Italian retired professional ice hockey Defenceman.  He played the majority of his pro career in the Italian league with brief stops in Austria and Germany.  Leo represented his country in the 1994, and 1998 winter Olympics.  Additionally he played for the junior national team three times and the senior team six times in world championships.

External links
 

1975 births
Living people
Asiago Hockey 1935 players
Ice hockey people from Bolzano
Bolzano HC players
Düsseldorfer EG players
HC Gardena players
Ice hockey players at the 1994 Winter Olympics
Ice hockey players at the 1998 Winter Olympics
Italian ice hockey defencemen
EC KAC players
HC Milano players
Nanaimo Clippers players
Olympic ice hockey players of Italy
Tucson Gila Monsters players
Italian expatriate ice hockey people
Italian expatriate sportspeople in Canada
Italian expatriate sportspeople in the United States